Zedea is a village in the Vayk Municipality of the Vayots Dzor Province of Armenia. There are a few khachkars in the vicinity of the village.

Etymology 
The village was previously known as Zeyta and Zeita.

Gallery

References

External links 

 

Populated places in Vayots Dzor Province